Jordan Macey (born 1983) is an Australian professional rugby union player, currently based in the Australian Capital Territory, having previously played for Melrose in Scotland.

Early life 

Macey grew up in Port Macquarie on the Mid North Coast of New South Wales, where he played rugby league for the Port Macquarie Sharks, before signing to play with the Wests Tigers.

Rugby career 

Macey played as a fullback for the West Magpies in the  NSW premier league competition. In  2005 he signed to play with the Manly Sea Eagles in the NRL. His NRL career was cut short following  a freak training incident involving head coach Des Hasler.

While out injured Macey signed a contract with Northern Suburbs in Sydney’s club rugby competition. Macey was also a Squad member of  the Central Coast Rays in the Australian Rugby Championship in 2007.

In 2008 Macey joined Scottish premier team Melrose and won the Scottish Cup, also being nominated for Scottish Player of the Year.

International career 

Macey represented the Australian Sevens team in 2006.

Current 

Macey is currently playing in the Shute Shield competition for Warringah Rugby Club and for the Queanbeyan Kangaroos.

References

1983 births
Australian rugby union players
Australia international rugby sevens players
Living people
People from the Mid North Coast
Rugby union players from New South Wales